David Yontef is a reality TV personality who was a contestant on the show Millionaire Matchmaker in 2011.  He later claimed that the show was faked.

In 2019, Yontef started a podcast called Behind the Velvet Rope, which features celebrity guests. The podcast became popular when conflict emerged between some of the housewives after comments were made during their interviews.

References

External links 

 Behind the Velvet Rope on Apple Podcast

Living people
Participants in American reality television series
Year of birth missing (living people)